Sara Watkins is the debut solo album by Sara Watkins. It was released by Nonesuch Records on April 7, 2009. The album reached No. 13 on the Heatseekers Albums chart at Billboard magazine.

Track listing

Personnel

Musicians

 Sara Watkins, vocals (1-8, 10-14), fiddle (2, 5, 6, 9-13), ukulele (7)
 Sean Watkins, guitar (1-3, 5, 6, 8, 9, 12, 13), harmony vocals (1, 5, 8), acoustic guitar (14)
 John Paul Jones, harmony vocals (1), bass (7, 8, 12-14), organ (11), electric piano (13), mandolin (13), piano (14)
 Jon Brion, guitar (6, 7), electric guitar (12, 14)
 Chris Eldridge, guitar (4), second guitar (7), harmony vocals (13)
 Greg Leisz, pedal steel guitar (1, 5-7)
 David Rawlings, drums (2), electric guitar (8), harmony vocals (8)
 Gillian Welch, electric guitar (2, 8), harmony vocals (8)
 Billy Cardine, dobro (2)
 Michael Witcher, dobro (3)
 Ronnie McCoury, mandolin  (4, 9)
 Chris Thile, mandola (10)
 Byron House, bass (2)
 Mark Schatz, bass (3, 9)
 Sebastian Steinberg, bass (1, 5, 6)
 Rayna Gellert, fiddle (2, 11)
 Benmont Tench, piano (1, 5, 12)
 Pete Thomas, drums (1, 5, 6, 12, 14)
 Luke Bulla, harmony vocals (10, 13)
 Claire Lynch, harmony vocals (11)
 Jenny Anne Mannan, harmony vocals (10)
 Tim O’Brien, harmony vocals (2, 6)
 Aoife O'Donovan, harmony vocals (11, 12)

Production and design
 John Paul Jones, production
 Dave Sinko, recording, mixing
 Eric Conn, mastering
 Jeremy Cowart, photography
 Wendy Stamberger, design

References

External links
 Sara Watkins official website

2009 debut albums
Sara Watkins albums